Antigua and Barbuda competed at the 1992 Summer Olympics in Barcelona, Spain. Thirteen competitors, nine men and four women, took part in fifteen events in three sports.

Competitors
The following is the list of number of competitors in the Games.

Athletics 

Men
Track and road events

Women 
Track and road events

Cycling 

Three male cyclists represented Antigua and Barbuda in 1992.

Road 
Men

Track 
Pursuits

Time trials

Points races

Sailing 

Men

Women

Open

See also
Antigua and Barbuda at the 1991 Pan American Games

References

External links
Official Olympic Reports

Nations at the 1992 Summer Olympics
1992
Olympics